The delta smelt (Hypomesus transpacificus) is an endangered slender-bodied smelt, about  long, in the family Osmeridae. Non-Indigenous to the upper Sacramento-San Joaquin Estuary of California, it mainly inhabits the freshwater-saltwater mixing zone of the estuary, except during its spawning season, when it migrates upstream to fresh water following winter "first flush" flow events (around March to May). It functions as an indicator species for the overall health of the Delta's ecosystem.

Because of its one-year lifecycle and relatively low fecundity, it is very susceptible to changes in the environmental conditions of its native habitat. Efforts to protect the endangered fish from further decline have focused on limiting or modifying the large-scale pumping activities of state and federal water projects at the southern end of the estuary, thereby limiting water available to farming. However, these efforts have not prevented the species from becoming functionally extinct in the wild.

Taxonomy and evolution

The delta smelt is one of five currently recognized species within the genus Hypomesus, which is part of the larger smelt family, Osmeridae. The genus has been subject to many revisions since it was first classified by Gill in 1863. The first major revision occurred in 1963, when the family Osmeridae was re-examined by Canadian ichthyologist Donald Evan McAllister. Expanding on Japanese researcher Hamada's earlier determination that H. olidus was not a monolithic widespread species, but rather one of three distinct species of Hypomesus, McAllister assigned them new names, and further delineated what he believed were four subspecies. This was the first description of H. transpacificus, named for its supposed occurrence on both sides of the Pacific, and also "to the friendship of Japanese and Canadian ichthyologists." He separated these geographically isolated populations into separate subspecies: H. t. transpacificus and H. t. nipponensis.

Modern analysis of the genus would elevate all of McAllister's subspecies to full species status, based on fin ray counts and the number of chromatophores between their mandibles, a change which genetic analysis has supported. In fact, genetic analysis would conclude that despite their morphological similarities, H. nipponensis and H. transpacificus are actually members of different phylogenetic clades.

The abbreviated distribution of Hypomesus species along both the east and west sides of the Pacific Ocean suggests that their common ancestor had a range that would have crossed the Pacific. Researchers have hypothesized that climatic changes may have reduced the range of the ancestral species during cooling periods, which would have created a reproductive barrier, allowing speciation to occur. Although the low number of species in the genus and high levels of homoplasy have frustrated attempts to determine whether the northern Pacific H. olidus or H. nipponensis are the basal species of Hypomesus, the most recent speciation event in Hypomesus is known to have been between the two native east Pacific species, H. pretiosus and H. transpacificus. This is plausibly due to a geographic isolation of a widespread eastern Pacific ancestor, of which some members were isolated in a freshwater basin in western California, possibly in the lakes that would have been located in the southern San Joaquin Valley during the Pleistocene epoch.

Habitat 
The delta smelt is endemic to the Sacramento–San Joaquin River Delta in California, where it is distributed from the Suisun Bay upstream through the delta in Contra Costa, Sacramento, San Joaquin, and Solano Counties.  The delta smelt is a pelagic (lives in the open water column away from the bottom) and euryhaline species (tolerant of a wide salinity range). It has been collected from estuarine waters with salinities up to 14 parts per thousand.

Historically, delta smelt were distributed from San Pablo Bay upstream to Sacramento on the Sacramento River and Mossdale on the San Joaquin River, which varied seasonally and with freshwater outflow. Today, large areas of historic delta smelt habitat and designated critical habitat have become unsuitable for some life history stages of the species, though key environmental characteristics (e.g. temperature, salinity, water depth) of these areas have not changed. Delta smelt disappeared from the southern portion of their historic habitat in the late 1970s, which coincides with substantial increases in the amounts of water exported from the delta. Water export operations likely have a great effect on the distribution, abundance, and genetic diversity of delta smelt.

Lifecycle 

The delta smelt is semelparous, living one year and dying after its first spawning.  Their spawning occurs in spring in river channels and tidally influenced backwater sloughs upstream of the mixing zone where salt water meets fresh water.  The Sacramento and San Joaquin Rivers then transport the delta smelt larvae downstream to the mixing zone, normally located in the Suisun Bay.  Young delta smelt then feed and grow in the mixing zone before starting their upstream spawning migration in late fall or early winter.

The delta smelt is preyed upon by larger fish, especially striped bass and largemouth bass, which are introduced species in the Sacramento-San Joaquin Delta.

Endangered status 
Historically, delta smelt were relatively abundant in the upper Sacramento-San Joaquin Estuary, with populations declining dramatically in the 1980s. They were listed as threatened by both federal and state governments in 1993, and sustained record-low abundance indices, prompted their listing as endangered under the California Endangered Species Act in 2010. Critical habitat was listed for delta smelt on December 19, 1994.

Delta smelt are threatened with extinction due to anthropogenic alterations to their ecosystem, including urbanization, non-native species, water diversions, contaminants, and the conversion of complex tidal habitats to leveed channels. A survey in April 2015 found only one individual delta smelt. Although the fish is almost extinct in the wild,  extant populations remain in a captive-breeding program at UC Davis and in a fish hatchery operated by the U.S. Fish and Wildlife Service near Shasta Dam.

Court protection
In 2005, the U.S. Fish and Wildlife Service (FWS) issued a biological opinion that the Central Valley Project and the California State Water Project were not having an adverse effect on the recovery of the delta smelt.  The Natural Resources Defense Council sued, and in 2007, Fresno U.S. District Court Judge Oliver Wanger found the biological opinion  was arbitrary and capricious and ordered protections for the delta smelt while the document was redone.

In 2008, at the close of the court's deadline, the FWS issued a new biological opinion. This time, the FWS came to the opposite of its earlier conclusion, finding the water projects were jeopardizing the continued existence of the delta smelt.  When six new plaintiffs sued, Judge Wanger preliminarily ordered the FWS to give him weekly justifications of delta flow restrictions and appointed four scientists as his own expert witnesses.  After haranguing FWS expert witnesses as “zealots”, in December 2010 Judge Wanger, again, found the FWS BioOp was arbitrary and capricious and, again, ordered the FWS to complete a new one.

In 2014, a divided panel of the Ninth Circuit Court of Appeals reversed Judge Wanger.  While the new biological opinion  was “a ponderous, chaotic document, overwhelming in size”, it was found not arbitrary and capricious.  The Ninth Circuit affirmed that the water projects were jeopardizing the existence of the delta smelt, and given TVA v. Hill's command that endangered species must be saved "whatever the cost", Circuit Judge Jay Bybee opined that California could only use the smelts' water after receiving an exemption from the God Squad.  In January 2015 the U.S. Supreme Court declined review without comment.

The smelt is unpopular among farmers, with a common complaint being that 200,000 acres of farmland have been left fallow due to "four buckets of minnows".  Although allegations have been made that this protection has hurt California's agricultural sector, with the devastation of hundreds of thousands of acres of farmland and the loss of tens of thousands of jobs in the Central Valley, a 2009 UC Davis study estimated that job losses due to smelt protection were closer to 5,000.

See also
California Aqueduct

References

External links
 The State Water Project

Hypomesus
Sacramento–San Joaquin River Delta
Fish of the United States
Endemic fauna of California
Environmental controversies
Fish described in 1963
Taxa named by Donald Evan McAllister
Critically endangered fauna of the United States